Legislative Affairs Office (LAO; Simplified Chinese: 法制办公室 Pinyin: Fǎzhì Bàngōngshì) was an administrative office within the State Council of the People's Republic of China which assisted the premier in providing legal advice and administrative laws to govern the behaviour of government departments. This included litigation, legal reconsideration, compensation, punishment, license, administrative charges and execution.
The office was managed by a director who ranks at the same level as a cabinet minister. The office was abolished and integrated to the Ministry of Justice in 2018.

History
The administrative office was originally established as the Bureau of Legislative Affairs of the state council in 1954. In 1959, the office was dissolved and a new body called the General Office was established to carry out similar functions. The General Office had two departments reporting to it: the Legislative Affairs Bureau and the Economic Legislation Research Center.

In 1986, the General Office was abolished and the two sub-agencies reporting to it were  merged to form the Bureau of Legislative Affairs under the State Council. In 1988, the BLA was defined as a functional institution under the oversight of the State Council. In 1998, the Legislative Affairs Office superseded the BLA and became the legal affairs department of the Chinese central government.

Administrative structure
The office is organised into the following departments.
Department of General Affairs (Department of Research)
Department of Politics, Labour and Social Security
Department of Education, Science, Culture and Public Health
Department of Fiscal and Financial Affairs
Department of Industry, Communications and Commerce
Department of Agriculture, Natural Resources and Environmental Protection
Department of Coordination on Government Legal Affairs (Department of Codification)
Department of Translation and Foreign Affairs
Information Center
Administration Service Center
China Legal Publishing House

References

External links
Legislative Affairs Office Official Website 

 

Government agencies of China
Legal organizations based in China
1998 establishments in China
Government agencies established in 1998
State Council of the People's Republic of China
Organizations based in Beijing